The Voice Kids is a Polish reality music talent show for aspiring singers aged 8 to 15, airing on TVP2. The third season premiered on New Year's Day 2020. Tomson & Baron, Dawid Kwiatkowski and Cleo returned as coaches. Tomasz Kammel returned as host, with Ida Nowakowska-Herndon as the new host, replacing Barbara Kurdej-Szatan. Marcin Maciejczak won the season, marking Dawid Kwiatkowski's first win as a coach.

Coaches

Teams 
 Colour key

Blind auditions 
Color key

Episode 1 (January 1, 2020) 
The coaches, Roksana Węgiel, Viki Gabor, Anna Dąbrowska, Carla Fernandes, Paweł Szymański, Oliwier Szot, Adam Kubera and current contestants performed "A Million Dreams"

Episode 2 (January 1, 2020) 
Ania Dąbrowska performed "Do Gwiazd"

Episode 3 (January 4, 2020) 
Roksana Węgiel performed "Potrafisz"

Episode 4 (January 4, 2020)

Episode 5 (January 11, 2020) 
Adam Kubera performed "Tak Jak Jest"

Episode 6 (January 11, 2020)

Episode 9 (January 25, 2020) 
Mateusz Golicki performed "Twój"

The Battle Rounds
Color key

Episode 11: Team Dawid (February 1, 2020) 
The Dawid's group performed "This Is Me" at the start of the show.

Sing offs

Episode 12: Team Tomson & Baron (February 8, 2020) 
The Tomson & Baron's group performed "We Are the World" at the start of the show.

Sing offs

Episode 13: Team Cleo (February 15, 2020) 
The Cleo's group performed "Za Krokiem Krok" at the start of the show.

Sing offs

Episode 14 Finale (22 February) 
Color key

Round 1

Round 2
Each contestant performed a duet with their judge, a cover and their original song.

Elimination chart 
Colour key
Artist's info

Result details

Teams
Color key
Artist's info

Results details

References

Kids series 3
2020 Polish television seasons